Schönberg is a municipality in the district of Mühldorf in the Upper Bavaria region of Bavaria, Germany.

References

Mühldorf (district)